Lawrence Laurent may refer to:

 Lawrence Laurent (1925-2020), United States television and radio critic
 Dame Lawrence Laurent, Saint Lucian educator, parliamentarian, ombudsman, and cultural enthusiast